The 2007–08 Writers Guild of America strike, which began on November 5, 2007, was a labor conflict that affected a large number of television shows that were due to be broadcast in the United States during the 2007–2008 television season. Negotiators for the striking writers reached a tentative agreement on February 8, 2008, and the boards of both guilds unanimously approved the deal on February 10, 2008.
Striking writers voted on February 12, 2008, to end the strike immediately, and on February 26, the WGA announced that the contract had been ratified with a 93.6% approval among WGA members.

Effect on shows

Shows with increased number of episodes
Some shows, especially unscripted or reality shows, benefitted from the strike by providing the networks with new material.

Unaffected shows
Some shows were not affected by the strike, being unscripted, not using union writers, or completing their production before the strike began.  Some shows made in Canada use mainly or solely Canadian writers and were thus unaffected by the US strike.

Unscripted shows

Shows with writing completed before strike

Shows that switched to non-union writers

Shows airing off-season

Shows delayed or interrupted by the strike
Some shows ran out of episodes, but caught up to their ordered amount after the strike.  Some other shows, such as talk shows, were interrupted, but made arrangements to return to screens early.

Shows with shortened seasons
Even though production began again on some shows, they were unable to complete the full season originally ordered.

Shows postponed
The production on some shows was halted completely, to be restarted, in the 2008–2009 season.

Shows cancelled during strike
Some shows cancelled during the strike were under threat of cancellation anyway. In other cases, shows were cancelled, or had their seasons shortened, because of the financial damage of the strike. Several television shows, including Journeyman, K-Ville, Big Shots, and Cavemen, were "quietly" cancelled, in part due to the writer's strike, and in part due to low ratings.

Unknown post-strike effects

There is still not enough known information about the following shows to categorize the effects on them.

Strike effect by type of show

Prime-time series
 Mid-season shows, such as Dirt and The Riches, began production after most other TV shows, so they had completed fewer episodes; although some show were produced early knowing a strike was possible. 24, also airing mid-season, was postponed due to the serial nature of the show.
 For some shows without full-season pickups such as Moonlight, production on the first batch of shows was completed.
 Scrubs creator Bill Lawrence responded to concerns that a proper series finale may not air,  as only 11 of its 18 ordered episodes were filmed at the time. Lawrence stated he would either release the finale on DVD or post what would have happened in episodes 13 through 18 on the internet. However, it was announced in May 2008 that ABC picked up Scrubs for an eighth season for 2008–2009.
 During the strike, ABC's Dirty Sexy Money was given a full season order. NBC also gave full season orders to Life, and Chuck and also announced that, contrary to recurring rumor, Bionic Woman would also continue production after the strike.
 FX Network's The Shield is one of the few shows that was able to air the entire season, as it was mostly wrapped before the strike started. Similarly, CBS's returning series, Jericho, aired midseason. Production of the full season was completed prior to the strike and was not affected by the work stoppage.
 Some networks such as CBS, due to the financial effects of the strike, ordered a reduced number of pilots.
 CBS aired a Canadian series, Flashpoint. NBC similarly aired the Canadian series The Listener, but pulled the show after one episode due to low ratings.

Talk shows
Late night comedy shows such as The Tonight Show with Jay Leno, Late Night with Conan O'Brien, Jimmy Kimmel Live!, Late Show with David Letterman, The Late Late Show with Craig Ferguson, The Daily Show with Jon Stewart, and Saturday Night Live began airing reruns immediately. Last Call resumed airing on December 3, with host Carson Daly explaining that if he did not do so, his staff would have been fired. On January 2, 2008, the Tonight Show and Late Night returned on NBC with new episodes. Conan O'Brien stated, "An unwritten version of 'Late Night,' though not desirable, is possible -- and no one has to be fired."

On November 12, 2007, instead of a recent episode, NBC aired an episode of The Tonight Show from November 17, 2003. Beginning the week of November 26, The Tonight Show began continuously airing "vintage" episodes. The Tonight Show was reportedly planning to air new episodes beginning November 19, having guest hosts to fill in for Jay Leno. This did not occur, however.

Several talk show hosts who refused to do their shows announced that they would pay non-striking staff members out of their own pockets through the end of the year, including David Letterman and Conan O'Brien. Jay Leno was chided when NBC fired his non-striking staff, after he promised them they would not have to worry about their jobs. Leno later announced that he would also pay his staff for the next 2 weeks starting December 2, 2007.

David Letterman and his Worldwide Pants, Inc. production company broke ranks with the networks and negotiated its own independent contract with the WGA in late 2007.  The deal was independent and only between the production company and the union, and allowed the company to start new shows in 2008.

Other
Although many animated series employ union writers, there is no requirement to do so.  For instance, the writers of South Park, Trey Parker and Matt Stone, were not union members, and the show remained in production during the strike.  The episode "Canada on Strike" was written as a parody of the WGA strike.

Movies, such as High School Musical 3: Senior Year, were directly affected by the strike, including those filmed on location. However, the strike did not affect reality shows such as American Idol, whose episodes are unscripted, or news programs, whose writers belong to a different guild.  Nevertheless, newswriters at CBS News and at local CBS owned-and-operated television stations (as well as CBS Radio news entities) were subject to the threat of a different strike action by the WGA. CBS News writers under the WGA had been without a contract with the network since April 2005 until a contract was agreed to on January 9, 2008.

Similarly, some game shows, such as Are You Smarter Than a 5th Grader? and The Price Is Right, were not affected because they are unscripted, other than the questions and the prize descriptions (and in Price's case, Showcase skits); by contrast, Sony Pictures' Jeopardy! and Wheel of Fortune, and Disney's Who Wants to Be a Millionaire had their quiz questions researched and written by WGA writers under deals with their producers.
The first season of the game show Duel premiered on December 17, 2007, and ended on December 23, 2007; the first season of the show was the only game show, and thus the only strike-replacement program, that was affected by the strike. The second season premiered on April 4, 2008, and ended on July 25, 2008, with an 8-week break between May 2 and June 27. A revival of American Gladiators was launched sooner than originally scheduled, with taping in November 2007 that aired in January 2008.  Other game, contest and reality shows launched sooner than originally scheduled in order to minimize the amount of scripted-program reruns, and CBS commissioned an order of six episodes of The Price Is Right $1,000,000 Spectacular, the first in the primetime series with new host Drew Carey (who took over hosting duties that season), which later resulted in four additional episodes later in the season.  This resulted in drastic mid-season set changes that allowed the show to switch to high-definition television, initially with these episodes, and the daytime show switched for the start of the next season.

While the strike had no effect on sporting events (which are unscripted), the strike also did not affect scripted professional wrestling, as both World Wrestling Entertainment (WWE) and Total Nonstop Action Wrestling had in-house ununionized writers. WWE, which had a contract with NBC Universal and aired the biennial Saturday Night's Main Event on the parent network, offered up additional wrestling shows for NBC if needed.

Nightline was the only late-night network program to benefit in the Nielsen ratings from the writers strike.  As well, many ABC, and some Fox, affiliates won their late news timeslots as a result of the strike, with most ending winning streaks of the local CBS or NBC affiliates.  Among these ABC and Fox affiliates were KABC-TV in Los Angeles, WCVB in Boston, WFAA in Dallas, WTTG in Washington, KSTU in Salt Lake City, KMSP in Minneapolis, KTVI in St. Louis, KOMO-TV in Seattle and WXYZ-TV in Detroit.

See also

 1988 Writers Guild of America strike
 1960 Writers Guild of America strike
 Impact of the COVID-19 pandemic on television in the United States
 Alliance of Motion Picture and Television Producers
 Writers Guild of America, East (WGAE)
 Writers Guild of America, west (WGAW)
 ABS-CBN franchise renewal controversy

References

Labor disputes in the United States
2007 in American television
2008 in American television
Writers Guild of America

fi:Käsikirjoittajien lakko 2007–2008#Vaikutukset